Two Funny – Die Sketch Comedy is a German television series.

See also
List of German television series

External links
 

2008 German television series debuts
2009 German television series endings
German comedy television series
German-language television shows
Sat.1 original programming